Kyle College is an independent, co-educational, boarding and day school situated about 6 km from the centre of Masvingo on Capota Road on the Eastern side of the Shagashe river. It has views of the Ruvure, Nyuni and Nyanda hills to the South, and the Mangwandi granite dome in the North West.

Kyle College is a member of the Association of Trust Schools (ATS) and the Headmaster is a member of the Conference of Heads of Independent Schools in Zimbabwe (CHISZ).

The School is known for its Rugby. The First XV is known as the VIKINGS. They have been co-opted into the Super 8 Rugby Schools.

Notable alumni
Tafadzwa Chitokwindo (Zimbabwe Sevens Rugby Player 2010-Current )

See also

List of schools in Zimbabwe
List of boarding schools

References

External links
 Kyle Preparatory School
 Kyle college official website

Private schools in Zimbabwe
High schools in Zimbabwe
Co-educational schools in Zimbabwe
Cambridge schools in Zimbabwe
Boarding schools in Zimbabwe
Educational institutions established in 1996
1996 establishments in Zimbabwe
Member schools of the Association of Trust Schools